On 30 November 1992, 32-year-old Tan Heng Hong (陈庆宏 Chén Qìnghóng), a Singaporean odd-job labourer and loan shark, was murdered by two security guards, S. S. Asokan and Maniam Rathinswamy, who lured him to a room at Tan Tock Seng Hospital under the pretext of offering to sell gold. After he was slashed to death with an axe and a knife, Tan's corpse was left inside his car and both Maniam and Asokan drove the car to Mandai, where they set the car alight to cover up the murder. The burnt car and charred remains of Tan were eventually discovered and it led to the police investigating Tan's death. Asokan and Maniam were both arrested more than a month later in Malaysia and Singapore respectively, and they were both found guilty of murder and executed on 8 September 1995.

Death of Tan Heng Hong
On 30 November 1992, a farmer accidentally discovered a burnt car with human remains (whose gender was unidentifiable) and a charred head of an axe inside a forested area at Mandai. The police investigated the case and therefore established it as a case of murder.

The victim was later identified as 32-year-old Tan Heng Hong (alias Ah Hong), a odd-job labourer who engaged in illegal moneylending activities. The car inside which Tan's body was discovered was purchased under the name of one of Tan's four brothers despite it being Tan's vehicle. Tan's widowed father was a fish seller and Tan himself was the third of five sons in his family and lived alone in a rental flat. He was reported missing for three days at the time his body was found and his death being discovered. According to Tan's father, Tan was last seen alive on 29 November 1992 when he came to pay respects to his deceased mother.

It was also established that Tan died either on the night of 29 November 1992 or the early morning of 30 November 1992. Professor Chao Tzee Cheng, a forensic pathologist, examined the body and found that there was little soot particles in the throat and lungs, and concluded that the victim did not die in the fire, and he determined that the cause of death was a cut artery to the neck of the victim, based on blood splatters found at the printing room of Tan Tock Seng Hospital, where Tan was last seen alive with two Indian men for a business matter. The injury to the neck, according to Professor Chao, caused excessive bleeding that led to Tan's death.

Arrests and indictments
On 8 January 1993, 37 days after the murder, it was reported that two suspects were arrested for committing Tan's murder. One of them, a 30-year-old security guard named S. S. Asokan, a Singaporean citizen, was first caught in Malaysia due to a robbery case in Johor, and he was wanted by the Royal Malaysia Police for three robberies that happened at Johor in 1989. Upon his arrest on 29 December 1992, Asokan confessed to the murder and implicated another man, his long-time friend Maniam Rathinswamy (whom Asokan first befriended in 1980), a security supervisor, as his accomplice of the murder.

Upon Asokan's confession, 25-year-old Maniam, also a Singaporean, was arrested in Singapore on 6 January 1993 and charged with murder two days later; the axe discovered inside the car was also proven to be purchased by Maniam prior to the murder. Asokan, on the other hand, was detained in Malaysia for trial on robbery, which would take place before he could return to Singapore to face a murder charge regarding Tan's death. It was further revealed that both Tan and Asokan were childhood friends who first knew each other when Asokan was seven years old.

Trial of Maniam Rathinswamy

On 29 November 1993, 26-year-old Maniam Rathinswamy stood trial for the murder of Tan Heng Hong. Maniam was represented by leading criminal lawyer Subhas Anandan, who would become notable eight years later for representing notorious wife killer Anthony Ler in 2001. Ong Hian Sun and Shanti Abdul Ghani were the prosecutors in charge of Maniam's trial.  

Maniam, in his account to the court, stated that he was not the one who killed Tan despite the axe being his. He stated that Asokan was the one who raised  the axe to hack at Tan's neck. He recounted that he and Asokan invited Tan to the printing room to have a peaceful talk about a deal to sell some gold to Tan, but the deal fell through as Tan did not comply to Asokan's demands to pay him his commission for some items which Asokan sold to Tan as his middleman. During the argument, Asokan picked up the axe to hack at Tan thrice, which frightened Maniam, who was forced to use a knife to stab Tan on the stomach upon Asokan's threats. Maniam said it was Asokan's idea to burn the body after they both did everything they could to hide Tan's corpse, so as to avoid retribution from the authorities. They even stole some of the jewellery and the watch that belonged to Tan before burning his corpse.

Anandan submitted to the court that Maniam, whom he argued was not involved in the murder, should not be regarded as one who shared the common intention with Asokan to kill Tan given that there was no premeditation to cause Tan to die and it resulted from a conflict, and he argued that the slash wounds inflicted by Asokan were responsible for causing Tan's death. However, the prosecution argued that there was circumstantial evidence that suggested both Maniam and Asokan had willingly acted with the common intention to perpertuate Tan's killing and the intention was evident from Maniam's assistance of Asokan's actions before, during and after Tan's death.

On 3 December 1993, Maniam, whose defence was rejected, was convicted of murder and sentenced to death by the trial judge T. S. Sinnathuray, who formerly heard the case of child killer Adrian Lim (executed in 1988). Subsequently, Maniam's appeal against his conviction was rejected on 16 March 1994.

Trial of S. S. Asokan

While Maniam Rathinswamy remained incarcerated on death row at Changi Prison for Tan Heng Hong's murder, S. S. Asokan remained in Malaysia, where he was tried and sentenced to prison for robbery. After he eventually finished serving his sentence, Asokan was released and extradited to Singapore on 13 August 1994, and faced a murder charge for fatally slashing Tan with an axe.

Asokan stood trial on 10 January 1995, and while testifying in court, he gave a different account compared to Maniam, which provided more details from his prespective regarding the case. Asokan told the court that Maniam was the one who brought the axe and knife to the printing room at Tan Tock Seng Hospital, and because Asokan was disappointed with Tan not paying up his commission for the pens and lighters Asokan helped Tan to sell, which led to the men planning to lure Tan to the hospital and to use the weapons to threaten Tan if he refused to comply and pay up the commission, and they thus invited him under the pretext of wanting to sell gold.

Asokan said that Tan did not comply, and both he and Maniam argued with one another. Maniam signalled to Asokan to grab the axe and hack at Tan's throat, which Asokan obeyed. Asokan hit Tan with the axe two more times before Maniam proceeded to stab the man with the knife. After which, the men disposed of Tan's corpse and burned his car with the body inside. Asokan's defence was that the weapons were intended to threaten Tan to pay up the undischarged commission and that he only followed Maniam's order to hit Tan with the axe. 

On 19 January 1995, Asokan was found guilty of murder and sentenced to death by Justice Lai Kew Chai (another source claimed it was High Court judge S. Rajendran who convicted Asokan and imposed the death penalty). Asokan's appeal was rejected on 17 April 1995, after he failed to substantiate his defence of having no common intention with Maniam to kill Tan or intent to cause the fatal injury.

Executions
On the morning of 8 September 1995, both Asokan and Maniam were hanged at Changi Prison.

In the aftermath, Singapore crime series Crimewatch re-enacted the case of Tan's murder in the tenth episode of the show's annual season in 1995. The case went on to become one of the cases notably solved by senior forensic pathologist Chao Tzee Cheng, and in 2014, it was dramatized in Whispers of the Dead, a Singapore crime show which covers the former cases taken by Professor Chao; inside the 2014 re-enactment, the killers and victim had their names changed to protect their identities - Maniam was renamed as Gopal Ramasamy, Asokan was renamed as Vijayan and the murdered man Tan Heng Hong was renamed as Ghim See.

See also
Capital punishment in Singapore

References

Murder in Singapore
1992 in Singapore
Capital punishment in Singapore
1992 murders in Singapore
Violence against men in Asia
Violence against men
20th-century executions by Singapore
Axe murder
Singaporean people convicted of murder